The 1947 Paris–Roubaix was the 45th edition of the Paris–Roubaix, a classic one-day cycle race in France. The single day event was held on 6 April 1947 and stretched  from Paris to the finish at Roubaix Velodrome. The winner was Georges Claes from Belgium.

Results

References

1947
1947 in road cycling
1947 in French sport
April 1947 sports events in Europe